Epigrimyia polita is a species of bristle fly in the family Tachinidae.

Distribution
United States

References

Dexiinae
Insects described in 1891
Taxa named by Charles Henry Tyler Townsend
Diptera of North America